Ricardo Alandy Sumilang (April 9, 1939 – May 2, 2017), also known by his stage name Romeo Vasquez, was a Filipino actor and former matinee idol of Philippine cinema.

Career
Vasquez was discovered by director Armando Garces who saw him while playing basketball in San Juan, Metro Manila, brought him to Sampaguita Pictures. He did several bit roles before his big break.

He was introduced in Miss Tilapia (1956) starring Gloria Romero and Susan Roces. He played younger brother to Amalia Fuentes in Lydia (1956). He starred in Pretty Boy (1957) with Amalia Fuentes, Sino ang Maysala? (1957) with Susan Roces, and Kilabot sa Makiling (1959) with Liberty Ilagan.

Vasquez played the son and Fred Montilla as the father in heavy drama Isinakdal Ko ang Aking Ama (1960). He did Dugo sa Aking Kamay (1961) with Barbara Perez, and Maruja (1967), an immortal love story by Mars Ravelo, starring Susan Roces.

He did the films Angelo (1970) with Amalia Fuentes, Nag-aapoy Na Damdamin (1976) with Vilma Santos, Bawal Na Pag-ibig (1977) with Alma Moreno, Dalawang Pugad, Isang Ibon (1977) with Vilma Santos, Diego Rival (1977) with Elizabeth Oropesa and Vivian Velez, Bakit Kailangan Kita? (1978) with Vilma Santos, and Gusto Kita, Mahal Mo Siya (1979) with Vilma Santos and Christopher de Leon.

In 1993, Vasquez returned to the Philippines after living for some time in Los Angeles in the United States. He ran for vice governor of Quezon during the 1995 elections, but he did not win.

He was cast as Col. Castillo in Urban Rangers (1995) with Raymart Santiago.

Personal life
Romeo Vasquez was born in Tayabas, Quezon, and was the former husband of actress Amalia Fuentes. He was the father of actress Liezl (late wife of actor Albert Martinez).
He had two other children in previous marriages:  Luigi Sumilang (c. 1960) and Karla Sumilang (c. 1965).

Death
Romeo Vasquez died of stroke on May 2, 2017 at the age of 78.

Awards and nominations
2006 Won Eastwood City Walk Of Fame Philippines Celebrity Inductee Winner
1968 Nominated FAMAS Award Best Actor Maruja (1967)
1966 Nominated FAMAS Award Best Actor Sapagkat Ikaw Ay Akin (1965)
1963 Nominated FAMAS Award Best Actor Pitong Kabanalan ng Isang Makasalanan (1962)
1959 Nominated FAMAS Award Best Actor Bobby (1958)
1958 Nominated FAMAS Award Best Supporting Actor Sino ang Maysala? (1957)
1958 Won Golden Harvest Award Best Actor Ako ang Maysala! (1958)
1958 Won Asia's Best Actor Ako ang Maysala! (1958)

Selected filmography
Miss Tilapia (1956)
Lydia (1956)
Sino ang Maysala? (1957)
Pretty Boy (1957)
Bobby (1958)
Ako ang Maysala! (1958)
Mga Reyna ng Vicks (1958)
Pitong Pagsisisi (1959)
Kahapon Lamang (1959)
Isinakdal Ko ang Aking Ama (1960)
Amy, Susie & Tessie (1960)
Habagat Sa Tag-araw (1961)
Suicide Commandoes (1962)
Limang Kidlat (1963)
Daigdig ng Matatapang (1964)
Isinulat sa Dugo (1965)
Ang Nasasakdal! (1966)
Maruja (1967)
Gaano Kita Kamahal? (1968)
Rowena (1969)
Angelo (1970)
Sa Aming Muling Pagkikita (1973)
Nag-aapoy Na Damdamin (1976)
Dalawang Pugad, Isang Ibon (1977)
Bakit Kailangan Kita? (1978)
Pag-ibig Ko sa Iyo (1978)
Swing It... Baby! (1979)
Ayaw Kong Maging Kerida (1983)
Nang Masugatan ang Gabi (1984)
Hello Lover, Goodbye Friend (1985)
The Vizconde Massacre (God, Help Us!) (1993)
The Untold Story: Vizconde Massacre II (May The Lord Be With Us!) (1994)
The Cecilia Masagca Story: Antipolo Massacre (Jesus Save Us!) (1994)
Urban Rangers (1995)
Reputasyon (1997)
Di Ba't Ikaw (TV series) (1999) (final role)

References

External links

1942 births
2017 deaths
20th-century Filipino male actors
Male actors from Quezon
People from Los Angeles